Steve Henderson may refer to:

 Steve Henderson (game designer), (1944–2006), co-designer of several Role Playing Game titles and supplements
 Steve Henderson (baseball), (born 1952), former Major League Baseball left fielder
 Steve Henderson (cricketer), (born 1958), former English cricketer

See also
 Stephen Henderson (disambiguation)